Hannah Marie Wagner  is an American dancer, choreographer, and beauty pageant titleholder from Wichita, Kansas, who was crowned Miss Kansas 2015. She competed for the Miss America 2016 title in September 2015.

Pageant career
In October 2014, Wagner was crowned Miss Augusta 2015 which made her eligible to compete at the 2015 Miss Kansas pageant in Pratt, Kansas. In her first attempt at the state title, Wagner entered the state pageant in June 2015 as one of 35 finalists. Over the two days of preliminary competition, Wagner won the Wednesday swimwear portion and the Thursday talent portion. Wagner's preliminary competition talent was performing ballet en pointe to a selection from Swan Lake. Her platform is "Fighting Women’s Complacency in the Workplace".

Wagner won the statewide competition on Saturday, June 6, 2015, when she received her crown from outgoing Miss Kansas titleholder Amanda Sasek. She earned more than $5,000 in scholarship money from the state pageant. As Miss Kansas, her activities include public appearances across the state.

Vying for Miss America 2016
Wagner was Kansas' representative at the Miss America 2016 pageant in Atlantic City, New Jersey, in September 2015. In the televised finale on September 13, 2015, she placed outside the Top 15 semi-finalists and was eliminated from competition. She was awarded a $3,000 scholarship prize as her state's representative.

Early life and education
Wagner is a native of Wichita, Kansas, and a 2014 graduate of Wichita High School East. Her father is Mark Wagner and her mother is Krista Wagner.

Wagner is a student at Wichita State University, majoring in business. While a student at Wichita State, Wagner became a member of the Alpha Phi international women's fraternity.

In 2017, Wagner accepted the position of choreographer for the Miss Kansas pageant before permanently relocating to Salt Lake City, Utah.

References

External links

Miss Kansas official website

Living people
1995 births
American beauty pageant winners
Miss America 2016 delegates
People from Wichita, Kansas
Wichita State University alumni